Hang Seng Bank Limited is a Hong Kong-based banking and financial services company with headquarters in Central, Hong Kong.  It is one of Hong Kong's leading public companies in terms of market capitalisation and is part of the HSBC Group, which holds a majority equity interest in the bank.

Hang Seng Bank is a commercial bank whose major business activities include retail banking, wealth management, commercial banking, treasury services, and private banking. Hang Seng Bank operates a network of around 260 service outlets in Hong Kong. It also has a wholly owned subsidiary in mainland China, Hang Seng Bank (China) Limited which has a network of 46 branches and sub branches.

It established the Hang Seng Index as a public service in 1969 and this stock market index is now generally known as the primary indicator of the Hong Kong stock market.

History 

In 1933, business partners Lam Bing Yim (林炳炎), Ho Sin Hang (何善衡), Sheng Tsun Lin (盛春霖), and Leung Chik Wai (梁植偉) founded Hang Seng Ngan Ho, the predecessor of Hang Seng Bank, in Hong Kong. Hang Seng means "ever-growing" in Cantonese. It commenced business as a simple money-changing shop at 70 Wing Lok Street, Sheung Wan, on 3 March 1933. In 1952, Hang Seng Bank became a private company and embarked on commercial banking. Hang Seng Bank converted into a public company in 1960. In 1965, Hang Seng Bank suffered a bank run which depleted almost one-quarter of its reserves. As a result, The Hongkong and Shanghai Banking Corporation (HSBC) acquired a controlling 51% interest in Hang Seng Bank, which it later increased to 62.14%.

In 1969, the Hang Seng Index was introduced as a public service. The index is now generally known as the indicator of the Hong Kong stock market. Hang Seng Bank was listed on the Hong Kong Stock Exchange in 1972. In 1981, Hang Seng Bank was given permission to run branches in MTR stations. Hang Seng Bank began to extend its business to China in 1985, with the opening of a representative office in Shenzhen. Ten years later, Hang Seng Bank opened its first Chinese branch in Guangzhou.

In 2002, Hang Seng Bank launched personal e-Banking in Mainland China. Hang Seng Bank opened its branch in Macau in 2003. In 2006, Hang Seng Bank received authorisation to get ready for the formation of its mainland China subsidiary bank. Within the same year, Hang Seng Bank introduced a brand revitalisation program and presented a new company slogan – Managing wealth for you, with you.

2007 was significant to Hang Seng Bank: the China Banking Regulatory Commission (CBRC) authorised the formation of Hang Seng Bank (China) Limited, the mainland China subsidiary bank of Hang Seng Bank which was established on 28 May 2007. In November, Hang Seng Bank opened its new Hong Kong office at MegaBox, Kowloon Bay. Hang Seng Bank became the first bank in Hong Kong to fix the renminbi (RMB) prime rate in 2010.

In February 2012, Hang Seng Bank introduced the world's first RMB gold exchange-traded fund (ETF). The brand value of Hang Seng Bank was ranked 65th globally in the 2012 Brand Finance Banking 500, the highest ranking for Hong Kong banks.

Overview
Hang Seng Bank is a commercial bank whose major business activities include retail banking and wealth management, corporate and commercial banking, treasury services, and private banking. Hang Seng Bank operates a network of around 260 service outlets in Hong Kong. Hang Seng Bank is the only local bank to offer extensive branch services along Mass Transit Railway (MTR) stations to better serve its customers.

Hang Seng Bank established its wholly owned subsidiary Hang Seng Bank (China) Limited in 2007. The subsidiary runs a mainland China network of 46 outlets in Beijing, Shanghai, Guangzhou, Shenzhen, Dongguan, Fuzhou, Nanjing, Hangzhou, Ningbo, Tianjin, Kunming, Foshan, Zhongshan, Huizhou, Xiamen, Zhuhai and Jiangmen with 12 branches and 34 sub-branches. For foreign currency wholesale business, Hang Seng Bank maintains branches in Shenzhen, Macau and Singapore, and also a representative office in Taipei.

The current chairperson is Ms. Irene Lee. The current vice-chairman and chief executive officer (CEO) is Ms. Diana Cesar.

Current leadership 

 Chairman: Irene Lee (since May 2021)
 Chief Executive: Diana Cesar (since September 2021)

List of former chairmen 
Role of chairman began in 1952, after incorporation as a bank
Ho Sin-hang (1952–1983)
 Sir Lee Quo-wei (1983–1996)
 David Eldon (1998–2005)
 Michael Smith (2005–2007)
Raymond Ch'ien (2007–2021)

List of former CEOs 
Role of CEO / general manager began in 1952, after incorporation as a bank
 Ho Tim (1952–1967)
Sir Lee Quo-wei (1967–1987)
Ho Tak-ching (1987–1993) 
Alexander Au (1993–1998)
 Vincent Cheng (1998–2005)
 Raymond Or (2005–2009)
 Margaret Leung (2009–2012)
 Rose Lee (2012–2017)
Louisa Cheang (2017–2021)

References

External links
 

 Hang Seng Bank official website

 
Banks established in 1933
Banks of Hong Kong
Companies listed on the Hong Kong Stock Exchange
Companies in the Hang Seng Index
Hang Seng
Hong Kong brands
1933 establishments in Hong Kong
1965 mergers and acquisitions